Ateliers d’Automobiles et d’Aviation was a Paris based automobile and commercial vehicle manufacturer between 1919 and 1920. The French manufacturer was noted for electric cars.

History of the business
Production of cars and light trucks began at the company's Paris workshops in the rue de Berri, in 1919. The name  Ateliers d’Automobiles et d’Aviation was generally reduced to AAA’.

With the First World War having ended only months earlier, there was at the time little contact between auto producers in France and those in Germany. There is no connection between Paris-based Ateliers d’Automobiles et d’Aviation (AAA) and the Berlin company AG für Akkumulatoren- und Automobilbau which between 1919 and 1922 was also producing cars under the name “AAA”.

The cars
The cars were powered by electric motors. The AAA was a large four door saloon. The cars advertised featured closed bodies with the simple square shape characteristic of 1920s car designs.
The price of 55,000 francs for the larger car even in bare chassis form was considered very high. However, the price included a ten-year “Mechanical guarantee”, which was at the time exceptional. The top speed quoted was 45 km/h (28 mph) and the range between charges was given as 120 km (75 miles). Power storage involved accumulator batteries with 42 cells.

Reference, sources and notes

Harald Linz, Halwart Schrader: Die Internationale Automobil-Enzyklopädie. United Soft Media Verlag, München 2008, .
George Nick Georgano (Chefredakteur): The Beaulieu Encyclopedia of the Automobile. Volume 1: A–F. Fitzroy Dearborn Publishers, Chicago 2001, . (englisch)

Electric vehicles introduced in the 20th century
Defunct motor vehicle manufacturers of France
Car manufacturers of France
Electric vehicle manufacturers of France
Manufacturing companies based in Paris
French companies established in 1919
Vehicle manufacturing companies established in 1919
Vehicle manufacturing companies disestablished in 1920
1920s disestablishments in France